Revenge of the Pink Panther is a 1978 comedy film. It is the sixth film in The Pink Panther comedy film series. Released in 1978, it is the final on-set performance of Peter Sellers in the role of Inspector Jacques Clouseau. It was also the last installment in the series that was distributed solely by United Artists; the company was absorbed by Metro-Goldwyn-Mayer 3 years after the film's release.

Plot 
Philippe Douvier, a major businessman and secretly the head of the French Connection, is suspected by his New York Mafia drug trading partners of weak leadership and improperly conducting his criminal affairs. To demonstrate otherwise, Douvier's aide Guy Algo suggests a show of force with the murder of the famous Chief Inspector Jacques Clouseau.

Douvier's first attempt at bombing Clouseau fails, and the subsequent attempt by Chinese martial artist 'Mr. Chong' is thwarted when Clouseau fights him off, believing him to be Clouseau's valet Cato, who has orders to keep his employer alert with random attacks. Douvier tries again by posing as an informant to lure Clouseau into a trap, but transvestite criminal Claude Russo steals Clouseau's car and clothes and is mistakenly killed instead by Douvier's men.

Clouseau is believed to be dead, prompting Clouseau's ex-boss, former Chief Inspector Charles Dreyfus, to regain his sanity and be released from the lunatic asylum to conduct the investigation. In Russo's clothes and protesting his true identity, Clouseau is himself taken to the asylum but escapes into Dreyfus' room, who faints from the shock of seeing Clouseau alive. Clouseau disguises himself as Dreyfus and is driven home by François.

At home, Clouseau finds Cato, who, despite having turned Clouseau's apartment into a Chinese-themed brothel, is relieved to see that he survived and the two plan revenge on the sponsor of Clouseau's assassination. Dreyfus is assigned to read a eulogy at Clouseau's funeral, during which his efforts to suppress hysterical laughter at the  words praising Clouseau's brilliance cause everyone to believe he is devastated by Clouseau's death. Clouseau attends the burial disguised as a priest, and surreptitiously reveals himself to Dreyfus, who faints and falls into the grave.

Douvier's wife threatens him with divorce over his unfaithfulness. Needing her respectability, Douvier breaks off his affair with his secretary Simone. She reacts angrily. Fearing she will expose him, Douvier orders she be killed at her nightclub. Acting on a tip-off, Clouseau and Cato inadvertently save her. Clouseau reveals his identity to Simone and she reveals it was Douvier who ordered Clouseau's assassination. Fleeing Douvier's henchmen, she tells him of Douvier's plan to meet the New York Mafia godfather Julio Scallini in Hong Kong for the Gannet Transaction - a $50,000,000 heroin sale.

Clouseau, Cato, and Simone journey to Hong Kong in disguise, unaware that Dreyfus is following them after overhearing their conversation. Clouseau impersonates Scallini while Simone distracts the real one, but one of Scallini's men spots Douvier leaving their hotel with a stranger, and Clouseau exposes his own disguise during the Gannet Transaction. Dreyfus, intent on killing Clouseau and followed by the gangsters, Cato, Simone and the Hong Kong Police, chases Clouseau into a warehouse and accidentally lights up the fireworks stored inside, catching all involved parties in the resulting chaos. Douvier and Scallini are arrested, Clouseau is awarded for their arrest by the President of France, and he and Simone spend an evening together.

Cast

Production 
When United Artists spent three months on previews and continuous editing of the previous Pink Panther movie The Pink Panther Strikes Again (according to Daily Variety in 1976), Edwards decided he would try to salvage any humorous material remaining. He suggested that Revenge of the Pink Panther should primarily be made up of this footage and that he would write and shoot new footage around it with Sellers and company. Sellers balked at this and insisted that Revenge feature all new footage. Sellers' contract for Revenge gave him story approval, which is why that film carries a story credit for Sellers that none of the previous films had.

The opening animated titles in the film were designed by DePatie-Freleng Enterprises, who had been involved with the series since the animated titles of the original 1963 film, The Pink Panther. It was the first time since Inspector Clouseau in 1968 that DePatie-Freleng animated the opening titles of a Pink Panther film (Return and Strikes Again having been done by Richard Williams' Studio).

The film was shot in France, England and in Hong Kong with some scenes filmed at The Excelsior hotel.

This is Graham Stark's first appearance as Professor Auguste Balls. He portrays him once more in Son of the Pink Panther (1993). Harvey Korman portrays Professor Balls in footage cut from The Pink Panther Strikes Again, but later used in Trail of the Pink Panther (1982).

Release
The film had its world premiere at the Odeon Leicester Square in London on July 13, 1978 and opened to the public the following day.

It opened in the United States at the Ziegfeld Theatre in New York City and at the Cinerama Dome in Los Angeles on July 19, 1978 before expanding to 387 theatres across the United States.

Critical reception
On review aggregator Rotten Tomatoes, the film has an approval rating of 84% based on 19 reviews, with an average score of 6.70/10.

Variety wrote, "Revenge of the Pink Panther isn't the best of the continuing film series, but Blake Edwards and Peter Sellers on a slow day are still well ahead of most other comedic filmmakers." Vincent Canby wrote in The New York Times "If you have the  habit, as I have, there's very little that Mr. Edwards and Mr. Sellers could do that would make you find the movie disappointing."  One DVD & video guide gave the movie four and a half out of five stars, calling it "arguably the best of the slapstick series."  In 1979, the film won the Evening Standard British Film Award for best comedy.

Box office
The film grossed $62,810 in its first three days at the Odeon Leicester Square.  On its US release, it grossed $5,278,784 in its first 5 days of release from 387 theatres and $11,004,124 in its first 12 days from 461 theatres in the United States and Canada.

Cancelled sequel 
Romance of the Pink Panther was a Pink Panther film that Sellers had written—and willing to make without Edwards—before Sellers' death in July 1980. UA considered recasting the role before convincing Blake Edwards to return to the series. Edwards chose to replace Clouseau with a new character rather than replace Sellers as Clouseau and to utilize outtakes from The Pink Panther Strikes Again to set up a transitional film (Trail of the Pink Panther) with new linking footage shot on the set of the new film (Curse of the Pink Panther).

Soundtrack 
Composed by Henry Mancini in his fifth Pink Panther film, its theme music and much of the soundtrack draw heavily from the disco trends of the late 1970s. The "Pink Panther Theme" itself was reworked to include a more dancy bassline, electric piano and guitar solo.

A soundtrack album for the film was released by United Artists Records.

References

External links 

 
 
 
 
 

1978 films
1970s American films
American sequel films
British comedy films
British sequel films
1970s English-language films
Films directed by Blake Edwards
Films scored by Henry Mancini
Films set in 1978
Films set in France
Films set in Hong Kong
Films with live action and animation
1970s police comedy films
The Pink Panther films
United Artists films
Films with screenplays by Blake Edwards
1978 comedy films
American films with live action and animation
1970s British films